Bonellitia is a genus of sea snails, marine gastropod mollusks in the family Cancellariidae, the nutmeg snails.

Species
Species within the genus Bonellitia include:
 Bonellitia scobina (Hedley & Petterd, 1906)

Species brought into synonymy
 Bonellitia afra (Petit & Harasewych, 2000): synonym of Admetula afra Petit & Harasewych, 2000
 Bonellitia atopodonta (Petit & Harasewych, 1986): synonym of Admetula atopodonta (Petit & Harasewych, 1986)
 Bonellitia bayeri (Petit, 1976): synonym of Admetula bayeri Petit, 1976
 Bonellitia cornidei (Altimira, 1978): synonym of Admetula cornidei (Altimira, 1978)
 Bonellitia epula (Petit & Harasewych, 1991): synonym of Admetula epula Petit & Harasewych, 1991
 Bonellitia garrardi (Petit, 1974): synonym of Admetula garrardi Petit, 1974
 Bonellitia gittenbergeri Verhecken, 2002: synonym of Admetula gittenbergeri (Verhecken, 2002) 
 Bonellitia superstes Finlay, 1930: synonym of Admetula superstes (Finlay, 1930)
 Bonellitia vossi (Petit, 1976): synonym of Admetula vossi Petit, 1976

References

 Hemmen J. (2007). Recent Cancellariidae. Wiesbaden, 428pp

Cancellariidae